The Dreamer is an album by multi-instrumentalist Yusef Lateef recorded in 1959 and released on the Savoy label.

Reception

A review in the British Gramophone magazine stated: "a great deal of his passionate, richtoned saxophone work can be heard here".

Track listing 
All compositions by Yusef Lateef except as indicated
 "Oboe Blues" - 5:49
 "Angel Eyes" (Earl Brent, Matt Dennis) - 5:13
 "The Dreamer" - 6:53
 "Arjuna" - 7:39
 "Can't Help Lovin' Dat Man" (Oscar Hammerstein II, Jerome Kern) - 8:02

Personnel 
Yusef Lateef - tenor saxophone, oboe - track 1
Bernard McKinney - euphonium
Terry Pollard - piano
William Austin - bass, rabat
Frank Gant - drums, percussion

References 

Yusef Lateef albums
1959 albums
Albums produced by Ozzie Cadena
Albums recorded at Van Gelder Studio
Savoy Records albums